Redo Rescue, formerly Redo Backup and Recovery, is a free backup and disaster recovery software. It runs from a bootable Linux CD image, features a GUI that is a front end to the Partclone command line utility, and is capable of bare-metal backup and recovery of disk partitions. It can use external hard drives and network shares.

After a long period of inactivity since 2012, the project has been resumed in 2020 adopting a shorter name: Redo Rescue. While the project was inactive, in 2019, it was forked to create Rescuezilla which is no longer based on Debian, but on Ubuntu.

In addition to backup software, the disk includes additional supporting programs such as:

 baobab
 chntpw
 cryptsetup
 drivereset
 Chromium
 fsarchiver
 geany
 gnome-disk-utility
 gparted
 grsync
 hdparm
 lshw-gtk
 partclone
 partimage
 photorec
 rsync
 scp
 smartctl
 ssh
 testdisk

See also
 List of data recovery software
 Disk cloning
 List of disk cloning software

References

External links
  
 
 Archived version of the earlier official website

Free system software
Free backup software
Free data recovery software